Nelmesia is a monotypic genus of flowering plants belonging to the family Cyperaceae. The only species is Nelmesia melanostachya .

It is native to Zaire.

The genus name of Nelmesia is in honour of Ernest Nelmes (1895–1959), an English botanist, gardener and librarian. He worked at Kew Gardens in the herbarium and library, he was also a specialist in Carex and Cyperaceae. The Latin specific epithet of melanostachya 
is a portmanteaux word, made of melano-	from the Greek word μελανός (melanós) meaning black and also -stachya from Stachyus derived from Greek word σταχυς (stachys), meaning "an ear of grain". Both the genus and the species were first described and published in Bull. Jard. Bot. État Bruxelles Vol.25 on page 143 in 1955.

References

Cyperaceae
Cyperaceae genera
Monotypic Poales genera
Plants described in 1955
Flora of the Democratic Republic of the Congo